US Airways Flight 1549 was a regularly scheduled US Airways flight from New York City (LaGuardia Airport), to Charlotte and Seattle, in the United States.  On January 15, 2009, the Airbus A320 serving the flight struck a flock of birds shortly after take-off from LaGuardia, losing all engine power. Given their position in relation to the available airports and their low altitude, pilots Chesley "Sully" Sullenberger and Jeffrey Skiles decided to glide the plane to ditching in the Hudson River off Midtown Manhattan. All 155 people on board were rescued by nearby boats, with only a few serious injuries.

The media quickly dubbed this water landing of a powerless jetliner with no deaths "the Miracle on the Hudson" and a National Transportation Safety Board official described it as "the most successful ditching in aviation history". Though the Board found the ditching could have been avoided by returning to LaGuardia, it affirmed the ditching as providing the highest probability of survival, given the circumstances.

The pilots and flight attendants were awarded the Master's Medal of the Guild of Air Pilots and Air Navigators in recognition of their "heroic and unique aviation achievement". The incident was dramatized in the 2016 film Sully, starring Tom Hanks as Sullenberger.

Background

On January 15, 2009, US Airways Flight 1549 with call sign "Cactus 1549" was scheduled to fly from New York City's LaGuardia Airport (LGA) to Charlotte Douglas International Airport (CLT) in Charlotte, North Carolina, with direct onward service to Seattle–Tacoma International Airport.
The aircraft was an Airbus A320-214 powered by two CFM International CFM56-5B4/P turbofan engines.

The captain and pilot in command was 57-year-old Chesley 'Sully' Sullenberger, a former fighter pilot who had been an airline pilot since leaving the United States Air Force in 1980. At the time, he had logged 19,663 total flight hours, including 4,765 in an A320; he was also a glider pilot and expert on aviation safety. First officer Jeffrey Skiles, aged  49, had accrued 20,727 career flight hours, including 37 in an A320, but this was his first A320 assignment as pilot flying. There were 150 passengers and three flight attendants on board.

Accident

Takeoff and bird strike

The flight was cleared for takeoff to the northeast from LaGuardia's Runway 4 at 3:24:56 pm Eastern Standard Time (20:24:56 UTC).

At 3:26:37, Sullenberger remarked to Skiles, "What a view of the Hudson today."

The pilots' view was filled with the large birds; passengers and crew heard very loud bangs and saw flames from the engines, followed by silence and an odor of fuel.
 
Realizing that both engines had shut down, Sullenberger took control while Skiles worked the checklist for engine restart.

At 3:27:33, Sullenberger radioed a mayday call to New York Terminal Radar Approach Control (TRACON): "... this is Cactus fifteen thirty nine [siccorrect call sign was Cactus 1549], hit birds. We've lost thrust on both engines. We're turning back towards LaGuardia". Air traffic controller Patrick Harten told LaGuardia's tower to hold all departures, and directed Sullenberger back to Runway 31. Sullenberger responded, "Unable".

Sullenberger asked controllers for landing options in New Jersey, mentioning Teterboro Airport. Permission was given for Teterboro's Runway 1, Sullenberger initially responded "Yes", but then: "We can't do it ... We're gonna be in the Hudson". Sullenberger commanded over the cabin address system to "brace for impact" and the flight attendants relayed the command to passengers. Meanwhile, air traffic controllers asked the Coast Guard to caution vessels in the Hudson and ask them to prepare to help with the rescue.

Ditching and evacuation

About ninety seconds later, at 3:31 pm, the plane made an unpowered ditching, descending southwards at about  into the middle of the North River section of the Hudson tidal estuary, at 	 on the New York side of the state line, roughly opposite West 50th Street (near the Intrepid Sea, Air & Space Museum) in Manhattan and Port Imperial in Weehawken, New Jersey. Flight attendants compared the ditching to a "hard landing" with "one impact, no bounce, then a gradual deceleration". The ebb tide then began to take the plane southward.

Sullenberger opened the cockpit door and gave the order to evacuate. The crew began evacuating the passengers through the four overwing window exits and into an inflatable slide/raft deployed from the front right passenger door (the front left slide failed to operate, so the manual inflation handle was pulled). The evacuation was made more difficult by the fact that someone opened the rear left door, allowing more water to enter the plane; whether this was a flight attendant or a passenger is disputed. Water was also entering through a hole in the fuselage and through cargo doors that had come open, so as the water rose the attendant urged passengers to move forward by climbing over seats. One passenger was in a wheelchair. Finally, Sullenberger walked the cabin twice to confirm it was empty.

Some evacuees waited for rescue knee-deep in water on the partially submerged slides, some wearing life vests. Others stood on the wings or, fearing an explosion, swam away from the plane. One passenger, after helping with the evacuation, found the wing so crowded that he jumped into the river and swam to a boat.

Rescue

Two NY Waterway ferries arrived within minutes and began taking people aboard using a Jason's cradle; numerous other boats, including from the U.S. Coast Guard, were quickly on scene as well. Sullenberger advised the ferry crews to rescue those on the wings first, as they were in more jeopardy than those on the slides, which detached to become life rafts. The last person was taken from the plane at 3:55 pm.

About 140 New York City firefighters responded to nearby docks, as did police, helicopters, and various vessels and divers. Other agencies provided medical help on the Weehawken side of the river, where most passengers were taken.

Aftermath

Passengers and crew sustained 95 minor and five serious injuries, including a deep laceration in the leg of one of the flight attendants. 78 people received medical treatment, mostly for minor injuries and hypothermia; 24 passengers and two rescuers were treated at hospitals, with two passengers kept overnight. Eye damage from jet fuel caused one passenger to need glasses. No pets were being carried on the flight.

Each passenger later received a letter of apology, $5,000 in compensation for lost baggage (and $5,000 more if they could demonstrate larger losses), and refund of their ticket price. In May 2009, they received any belongings that had been recovered. Passengers also reported offers of $10,000 each in return for agreeing not to sue US Airways.

Many passengers and rescuers later experienced post-traumatic stress symptoms such as sleeplessness, flashbacks, and panic attacks; some began an email support group. Patrick Harten, the controller who had worked the flight, said that "the hardest, most traumatic part of the entire event was when it was over", and that he was "gripped by raw moments of shock and grief".

In an effort to prevent similar accidents, officials captured and gassed 1,235 Canada geese at 17 locations across New York City in mid-2009 and coated 1,739 goose eggs with oil to smother the developing goslings.
As of 2017, 70,000 birds had been intentionally killed in New York City as a result of the ditching.

N106US, the accident aircraft, was purchased by the Carolinas Aviation Museum in Charlotte, North Carolina, where it (and the plane's engines) were put on display.

Investigation

On January 17 the aircraft was taken by barge to New Jersey. The left engine, which had been detached from the aircraft by the ditching, was recovered from the riverbed on January 23.

The initial National Transportation Safety Board (NTSB) evaluation that the plane had lost thrust after a bird strike was confirmed by analysis of the cockpit voice and flight data recorders.

It was found in the investigation that two days before the accident, the aircraft had experienced a compressor stall on the right engine, but the engine had restarted and the flight completed. A faulty temperature sensor was found to be the cause of the compressor stall. This sensor had been replaced and the inspection also verified the engine had not been damaged in that incident.

On January 21, the NTSB found evidence of damage from a soft-body impact in the right engine along with organic debris including a feather. The left engine also showed soft-body impacts, with "dents on both the spinner and inlet lip of the engine cowling. Five booster inlet guide vanes are fractured and eight outlet guide vanes are missing." Both engines, missing large portions of their housings, were sent to the manufacturer for examination. On January 31, the plane was moved to Kearny, New Jersey. The bird remains were later identified by DNA testing to be Canada geese, which typically weigh more than engines are designed to withstand ingesting.

Since the plane had been assembled in France, the European Aviation Safety Agency (EASA; the European counterpart of the FAA) and the Bureau of Enquiry and Analysis for Civil Aviation Safety (BEA; the French counterpart of the NTSB) joined the investigation, with technical assistance from Airbus and GE Aviation/Snecma, respectively the manufacturers of the airframe and the engines.

The NTSB used flight simulators to test the possibility that the flight could have returned safely to LaGuardia or diverted to Teterboro; only seven of the 13 simulated returns to La Guardia succeeded, and only one of the two to Teterboro. Furthermore, the NTSB report called these simulations unrealistic: "The immediate turn made by the pilots during the simulations did not reflect or account for real-world considerations, such as the time delay required to recognize the bird strike and decide on a course of action." A further simulation, in which a 35-second delay was inserted to allow for those, crashed. In testimony before the NTSB, Sullenberger maintained that there had been no time to bring the plane to any airport and that attempting to do so would likely have killed those onboard and more on the ground.

The Board ultimately ruled that Sullenberger had made the correct decision, reasoning that the checklist for dual-engine failure is designed for higher altitudes when pilots have more time to deal with the situation, and that while simulations showed that the plane might have just barely made it back to LaGuardia, those scenarios assumed an instant decision to do so, with no time allowed for assessing the situation.

On May 4, 2010, the NTSB issued its final report, which identified the probable cause as "the ingestion of large birds into each engine, which resulted in an almost total loss of thrust in both engines". The final report credited the outcome to four factors: good decision-making and teamwork by the cockpit crew (including decisions to immediately turn on the APU and to ditch in the Hudson); that the A320 is certified for extended overwater operation (and hence carried life vests and additional raft/slides) even though not required for that route; the performance of the flight crew during the evacuation; and the proximity of working vessels to the ditching site. Contributing factors were good visibility and fast response times from the ferry operators and emergency responders. The report made 34 recommendations, including that engines be tested for resistance to bird strikes at low speeds; development of checklists for dual-engine failures at low altitude, and changes to checklist design in general "to minimize the risk of flight crewmembers becoming stuck in an inappropriate checklist or portion of a checklist"; improved pilot training for water landings; provision of life vests on all flights regardless of route, and changes to the locations of vests and other emergency equipment; research into improved wildlife management, and technical innovations on aircraft, to reduce bird strikes; research into possible changes in passenger brace positions; and research into "methods of overcoming passengers' inattention" during preflight safety briefings.

Author and pilot William Langewiesche asserted that insufficient credit was given to the A320's fly-by-wire design, by which the pilot uses a side-stick to make control inputs to the flight control computers. The computers then impose adjustments and limits of their own to keep the plane stable, which the pilot cannot override even in an emergency. This design allowed the pilots of Flight 1549 to concentrate on engine restart and deciding the course, without the burden of manually adjusting the glidepath to reduce the plane's rate of descent. However, Sullenberger said that these computer-imposed limits also prevented him from achieving the optimal landing flare for the ditching, which would have softened the impact.

Crew awards and honors

An NTSB board member called the ditching "the most successful... in aviation history. These people knew what they were supposed to do and they did it and as a result, no lives were lost."
New York State Governor David Paterson called the incident "a Miracle on the Hudson". U.S. President George W. Bush said he was "inspired by the skill and heroism of the flight crew," and praised the emergency responders and volunteers. President-elect Barack Obama said that everyone was proud of Sullenberger's "heroic and graceful job in landing the damaged aircraft". He thanked the crew, whom he invited to his inauguration five days later.

The Guild of Air Pilots and Air Navigators awarded the crew the rarely bestowed Master's Medal on January 22, 2009, for outstanding aviation achievement, at the discretion of the Master of the Guild. New York City Mayor Michael Bloomberg presented the crew with the Keys to the City, and Sullenberger with a replacement copy of a library book lost on the flight, Sidney Dekker's Just Culture: Balancing Safety and Accountability. Rescuers received Certificates of Honor.

The crew received a standing ovation at the Super Bowl XLIII on February 1, 2009, and Sullenberger threw the ceremonial first pitch of the 2009 Major League Baseball season for the San Francisco Giants. His Giants jersey was inscribed with the name "Sully" and the number 155the count of people aboard the plane.

On July 28, passengers Dave Sanderson and Barry Leonard organized a thank-you luncheon for emergency responders from Hudson County, New Jersey, on the shores of Palisades Medical Center in North Bergen, New Jersey, where 57 passengers had been brought following their rescue. Present were members of the U.S. Coast Guard, North Hudson Regional Fire and Rescue, NY Waterway Ferries, the American Red Cross, Weehawken Volunteer First Aid, the Weehawken Police Department, West New York E.M.S., North Bergen E.M.S., the Hudson County Office of Emergency Management, the New Jersey E.M.S. Task Force, the Guttenberg Police Department, McCabe Ambulance, the Harrison Police Department, and doctors and nurses who treated survivors.

Sullenberger was named Grand Marshal for the 2010 Tournament of Roses Parade in Pasadena, California.

In August 2010, aeronautical chart publisher Jeppesen issued a humorous approach plate titled "Hudson Miracle APCH," dedicated to the five crew of Flight 1549 and annotated "Presented with Pride and Gratitude from your friends at Jeppesen".

Sullenberger retired on March 3, 2010, after thirty years with US Airways and its predecessor, Pacific Southwest Airlines. At the end of his final flight he was reunited with Skiles and a number of the passengers from Flight 1549.

In 2013, the entire crew was inducted into the International Air & Space Hall of Fame at the San Diego Air & Space Museum.

Media

Sullenberger's 2009 memoir, Highest Duty: My Search for What Really Matters, was adapted into the feature film Sully, directed by Clint Eastwood. It starred Tom Hanks as Sullenberger and Aaron Eckhart as co-pilot Jeff Skiles. It was released by Warner Bros. on September 9, 2016.

It was featured in an episode of the TV show Mayday with the title "Hudson River Runway"; the episode is from season 10, episode 5.

It is featured in season 1, episode 1, of the TV show Why Planes Crash.

See also 
 List of airline flights that required gliding

Notes

References

External links

National Transportation Safety Board 
Accident Report
Investigation docket

Other links

 Twitter Moment - Sullenberger's recollections, ten years on

Accidents and incidents involving the Airbus A320
Airliner accidents and incidents caused by bird strikes
Airliner accidents and incidents in New Jersey
Airliner accidents and incidents in New York City
Airliner accidents and incidents involving ditching
Aviation accidents and incidents in the United States in 2009
Aviation accidents and incidents in 2009
Hudson River
1549
2009 in New Jersey
2009 in New York City
Articles containing video clips
January 2009 events in the United States
Weehawken, New Jersey